Double Whammy is a 2001 comedy/drama film written and directed by Tom DiCillo and starring Denis Leary, Elizabeth Hurley and Steve Buscemi. Although intended to be released in theaters, it was ultimately distributed direct-to-video.

Plot

Ray Pluto has horrid memories of watching his wife and child die in a traffic accident.  He's also a cop who's the laughingstock of New York City because his back failed while he was trying to stop a mass murderer — who was then shot by a child.  For his back, he gets help from a chiropractor.  Meanwhile, a teenager hires thugs to kill her father, who's the super in Ray's apartment building.  In the same building, two young men are writing a movie script.  Ray tries to get past his grief to solve the assault on the super and also return the affections of the chiropractor.

Cast
 Denis Leary as Detective Ray Pluto, a police detective suffering from back problems.
 Elizabeth Hurley as Dr. Ann Beamer, Pluto's chiropractor.
 Steve Buscemi as Detective Jerry Cubbins, Pluto's partner.
 Melonie Diaz as Maribel Benitez, who hires thugs to kill her father.
 Luis Guzmán as Juan Benitez, Maribel's father.
 Donald Faison as Cletis, one of the writers in the building.
 Victor Argo as Lieutenant Spigot
 Chris Noth as Detective Chick Dimitri
 Keith Nobbs as Duke
 Maurice Compte as Joe "Jo-Jo"
 Otto Sanchez as "Ping Pong"
 Kevin Olson as Ricky Lapinsky
 Bill Boggs as Bill Berman
 Gerry Bamman as The Mayor
 Sally Jessy Raphael as herself
 Sharon Wilkins as Techa
 Caprice Benedetti as Shelley

Reception
The film holds a 36% approval rating on Rotten Tomatoes based on 11 reviews, with an average rating of 4.67/10.

Footnotes

External links

2001 films
2001 comedy-drama films
Gold Circle Films films
2001 direct-to-video films
Films directed by Tom DiCillo
2000s English-language films